Mont Albert is an inner eastern suburb of Melbourne, Victoria, Australia, 12 kilometres east of Melbourne's Central Business District, located within the Cities of Boroondara and Whitehorse local government areas. Mont Albert recorded a population of 4,948 at the 2021 census.

The main shopping centre of Mont Albert is Hamilton Street, a small street lined with shops. The suburb had its own railway station before being demolished as part of the Level Crossing Removal Project.

History

Mont Albert Post Office opened on 1 August 1914. A Mont Albert North Post Office opened in 1957 and closed in 1993.

The town is most likely named after the husband of Queen Victoria, Albert, Prince Consort (1819–1861).
The local shopping centre (Hamilton Street (pictured to the right) began to be built in about 1913, immediately south of the railway station. A tram service along Whitehorse Road, to the suburb's north-eastern corner, was opened in 1915. Houses between the tram and railway lines are characterised as Edwardian, English Domestic Revival and Arts and Crafts traditions.

Demographics 
At the 2016 Australian Census, there were 4,840 people living in Mont Albert as their hometown.

 47.6% of the population were male and 52.4% were female.
 The median age of a resident in Mont Albert was 40 years old.
 There were 1,286 families residing in Mont Albert.
 There were 2,018 private dwellings in Mont Albert, with 1.7 motor vehicles being owned as a median.
 52.9% of the population were married and 32.5% were never married. 
 23.5% of the registered citizens were of English ancestry, 21.4% of Australian ancestry, 13.3% of Chinese ancestry, 9.0% of Irish ancestry and 7.8% of Scottish ancestry.
 66.6% of Citizens were born in Australia.
 39.8% of the population in Mont Albert are irreligious, 19.3% Catholic, 11.0% Anglican, 7.2% not stated and 3.9% Uniting Church.

Education
 Mont Albert Primary School, opened in 1917
 Box Hill Institute (though the buildings on the East side of Elgar Road are part of Box Hill)

Public transport 

 Cable tram
Route 109 (Melbourne Trams) travels on Whitehorse Road through the suburb. It travels from Box Hill to Port Melbourne, and back.
 Buses
 The nearest bus terminal lies at Box Hill Railway Station, where many buses terminate and depart from. Box Hill is a neighbouring suburb of Mont Albert.
 Trains 
 The Mont Albert Railway Station, which is positioned on Churchill Street, runs through the suburb. Opened in August 1890, this three platform station runs along the Belgrave/Lilydale Line. Services offered are in towards the city (Flinders Street Station), or out to Blackburn, Belgrave or Lilydale, run by Metro Trains.

Major attractions

Walking and exercise trails 
Mont Albert (and Mont Albert North) contain many walking trails. These include:

 The Heritage Trail 
 This is a Heritage Trail, about 5 km, developed by the City of Whitehorse. This starts and ends at the Mont Albert single storey railway station, constructed in 1911, and head east along Churchill Street.
 Gawler Chain (Mont Albert North)
 A shared two-kilometre trail which runs along Bushy Creek. It starts near Koonung Secondary College (a local State School in Mont Albert North) and passes through several small parks and picnic grounds.
 Koonung Trail (Mont Albert North) 
 This trail runs through Elgar Park and through the Koonung Creek Linear Park. It passes by wetlands, which are a key feature of this trail.

Eateries and stores 
 Mont Albert boasts many cafés, restaurants and eateries of high reputation. Hamilton Street, Whitehorse Road and Mont Albert Road contain many eateries which are recommended by many locals. Hamilton Street also offers many retail stores, pharmacies, butchers and supermarkets. These stores are all accessible from the street. The opening times may vary from store to store.

Sport 
There are many sporting opportunities for people of all ages, and many clubs and facilities in the neighbouring suburbs. These include:

 Mont Albert Cricket Club
 Surrey Park Lacrosse Club
 ECHO Hockey Club

Notable people 
 Matt Rowell, AFL footballer
 Frank Sedgman, former world No. 1 tennis player

Politics 
State:

 In the 2018 Victorian State Election, the polling booth in Mont Albert returned the following votes:
 Clark, Robert, Liberal Party of Victoria: 697 votes 
 Hamer, Paul, Labor Party of Victoria: 585 votes 
 Other candidates: 250 votes 
 Despite citizens of Mont Albert favouring Robert Clark over Paul Hamer, Hamer was elected as the MP for Box Hill.
 After the distribution of preferences, Paul Hamer received 19,982 votes (52.10% of the vote), whilst Robert Clark received 18,369 votes (47.90% of the vote).

Federal:

 In the 2019 Australian Federal Election, the polling booth in Mont Albert returned the following votes:
 Frydenberg, Josh, Liberal Party of Australia: 460 votes
 Burnside, Julian, Australian Greens: 284 votes
 Stewart, Jana, Australian Labor Party: 220 votes
 Other candidates: 126 votes 
 The citizens of Mont Albert favoured Josh Frydenberg to be returned for a third term. Frydenberg suffered a −6.4% swing in Kooyong, however, he still retained the seat described as a 'blue ribbon' seat.
 After the distribution of preferences, Josh Frydenberg received 55,159 votes (55.70% of the vote), whilst Julian Burnside received 43,870 votes (44.30% of the vote).

See also
 City of Box Hill – Mont Albert was previously within this former local government area.
 List of Government Schools in Victoria – A list of Government schools, including Mont Albert Primary School 
 Belgrave Railway Line
 Lilydale Railway Line

References

Suburbs of Melbourne
Suburbs of the City of Whitehorse
Suburbs of the City of Boroondara